Ignacio Miguel "Nacho" Bergara de Medina (20 July 1940 – 4 January 2004) was a professional football player and manager.

Career
Bergara was born in Montevideo and began his playing career with local side Racing Club de Montevideo. Ignacio and his brother Danny were two of three Uruguayan players signed by Spanish first division side RCD Mallorca in August 1962. He would join RCD Espanyol in August 1964, playing several more seasons in the Spanish first division with the club. He also played for C.D. San Andrés in the Spanish third division.

Following his playing career, Bergara became a football manager. He managed C.D. San Andrés twice before leading Albacete Balompié from 1981 to 1984, helping the club promote to the Spanish third division during his tenure.

Personal
Bergara died in Ibiza, Spain on 4 January 2004. His brother, Danny, was also a professional football player and manager.

References

External links
 

1940 births
2004 deaths
Uruguayan footballers
Uruguayan football managers
Racing Club de Montevideo players
RCD Mallorca players
UE Sant Andreu footballers
RCD Espanyol footballers
Albacete Balompié managers
UE Sant Andreu managers
Association football defenders